is the third studio album by Japanese singer/songwriter Mari Hamada, released on June 21, 1984 by Invitation. It is the first album to have Hamada credited as a songwriter and co-producer. The album was reissued alongside Hamada's past releases on January 15, 2014.

Misty Lady peaked at No. 280 on Oricon's albums chart upon its 2014 reissue.

Track listing

Charts

Personnel 
 Kenji Kitajima – guitar
 Hiro Nagasawa – bass
 Yoshihiro Naruse – bass
 Yōgo Kōno – keyboards
 Atsuo Okamoto – drums

Video album 

The video album for Misty Lady was released on VHS and LaserDisc formats on July 21, 1984. It was reissued on DVD by Victor Entertainment under the Speedstar label on January 21, 2005.

Track listing

References

External links 
  (Mari Hamada)
  (Victor Entertainment)
 
 

1984 albums
1984 video albums
Japanese-language albums
Mari Hamada albums
Albums produced by Daiko Nagato
Victor Entertainment albums